The 2017–18 Australian Baseball League season was the eighth Australian Baseball League (ABL) season, and was held from 16 November 2017 to 11 February 2018. It was the last season of the ABL that was played with 6 teams, as the league expanded to eight teams for the 2018–19 season.

The league also saw a large spike in offensive production with the single season home-run, run, AVG, SLG & OPS records all broken and home runs doubled, leading to a juiced ball theory.

Teams

Regular season

Postseason

Statistical leaders

Championship Series

References

External links 
The Australian Baseball League – Official ABL Website
Official Baseball Australia Website

Australian Baseball League seasons
Australian Baseball League
Australian Baseball League